Bab Boudir is a commune in the Taza Province of the Fès-Meknès administrative region of Morocco. At the time of the 2004 census, the commune had a total population of 6,100 in 898 households.

References

Populated places in Taza Province
Rural communes of Fès-Meknès